The following is a list of awards and nominations received by Joe Pesci. Pesci won the BAFTA Award for Most Outstanding Newcomer to Lead Film Roles and was nominated for the Academy Award for Best Supporting Actor and Golden Globe Award for Best Supporting Actor in a Motion Picture for his role as Joey LaMotta in Raging Bull. He won the Academy Award for Best Supporting Actor for portraying psychopathic gangster Tommy DeVito (based on Thomas DeSimone) in Goodfellas, and was nominated for the Golden Globe Award for Best Supporting Actor in a Motion Picture. He was nominated for the latter again and the Screen Actors Guild Award for Outstanding Performance by a Male Actor in a Supporting Role for playing Russell Bufalino in The Irishman.

Major associations

Academy Awards

British Academy Film Awards

Golden Globe Awards

Screen Actors Guild Awards

Other associations

20/20 Award

American Comedy Awards

Australian Academy of Cinema and Television Arts Awards

Award Circuit Community Award

Berlin International Film Festival

Blockbuster Entertainment Awards

Boston Society of Film Critics

CableACE Award

Chicago Film Critics Association

Critics' Choice Awards

Dallas–Fort Worth Film Critics Association

Golden Raspberry Awards

Hollywood Critics Association

Kansas City Film Critics Circle Award

Los Angeles Film Critics Association

MTV Movie & TV Awards

National Board of Review

National Society of Film Critics

New York Film Critics Circle

Satellite Awards

The Stinkers Bad Movie Award

References

External links
 

Pesci, Joe